Cathrine Dahl (born 17 August 1855 at Kongsvinger; died 6 June 1906 in Kristiania) was the first woman in Norway to take a legal education. As no-one would hire a woman in a legal position, Cathrine Dahl was to teach in a primary school until her death.

References

1855 births
1906 deaths
Norwegian women lawyers
Norwegian schoolteachers
People from Kongsvinger
19th-century women lawyers